Take Out the Trash is an album by the American punk rock band Legal Weapon. It was released in 1991 on Triple X Records.

The photography for the album was by Edward Colver.

Critical reception
AllMusic called it a "generally decent, if less than exceptional, slice of hard rock/arena rock."

Track listing
All songs written by Kat Arthur and Brian Hansen, except "96 Tears" by Rudy Martinez.

Personnel
Legal Weapon
Kat Arthur – vocals
Danny Halperin – drums
Brian Hansen – guitar, vocals
Tom Slick – bass guitar, vocals

Additional musicians and production
Ron Champagne – production, engineering
Ed Colver – photography
Legal Weapon – production
Pete Magdaleno – engineering

References

1991 albums
Legal Weapon albums
Triple X Records albums